Henry Conway may refer to:
Sir Henry Conway, 1st Baronet (1630–1669), MP for Flintshire, of the Conway Baronets
Henry Seymour Conway (1721–1795), British general and statesman
Henry Wharton Conway (1793–1827), delegate from the Arkansas Territory to the United States House of Representatives
Henry Conway (socialite) (born 1983), London-based socialite, club promoter and fashion journalist

See also
Henry Conway Belfield (1855–1923), British Resident in three Malay states and former Governor of Kenya
Lord Henry Seymour-Conway (1746–1830), former British and Irish MP
Harry Conway (born 1992), Australian cricketer
Conway (disambiguation)